Ask the Ages is the final album recorded by jazz guitarist Sonny Sharrock during his lifetime (though posthumous albums of earlier recorded material would follow). It was recorded with producer Bill Laswell and released in 1991; It featured Sharrock alongside saxophonist Pharoah Sanders, bassist Charnett Moffett and drummer Elvin Jones. Sharrock passed away on May 25th, 1994.

Critical reception 

In a contemporary review for the Chicago Tribune, Greg Kot said Ask the Ages was a thrilling and essential album for fans of the guitar: "Despite the volcanic power of his playing, Sharrock's majesty is in the lyricism and warmth he finds in even the most abrasive alleyways." Rolling Stone magazine said it sounded like a "classic free-blowing jazz album from the Sixties had been recorded with the clarity and punch of today's rock". In The Village Voice, Robert Christgau gave it an "honorable mention" and described it as "Bill and Elvin's excellent jazz record". He singled out "Little Rock" as the highlight. In the Pazz & Jop, an annual poll of prominent American critics, Ask the Ages was voted the 15th best album of 1991.

In a retrospective review, AllMusic's Steve Huey cited Ask the Ages as Sharrock's best work: "the most challenging jazz work he recorded as a leader, and it's the clearest expression of his roots as a jazz player, drawing heavily on [John] Coltrane's modal post-bop and concepts of freedom." In the Spin Alternative Record Guide (1995), the record was ranked 88th on a list of the "Top 100 Alternative Albums".

Track listing
"Promises Kept" –9:43
"Who Does She Hope to Be?" –4:41
"Little Rock" –7:12
"As We Used to Sing" –7:45
"Many Mansions" –9:31
"Once Upon a Time" –6:26
(all compositions by Sonny Sharrock)

Personnel
Sonny Sharrock — electric guitar
Pharoah Sanders — tenor & soprano saxophones
Elvin Jones — drums
Charnett Moffett — acoustic bass
Bill Laswell — producer

References

External links
Sonny Sharrock's Ask the Ages — article by Trevor MacLaren from All About Jazz.

Sonny Sharrock albums
1991 albums
Axiom (record label) albums
Albums produced by Bill Laswell